North Spit is a rocky spit forming the north side of the entrance to Marian Cove, King George Island, in the South Shetland Islands. The descriptive name appears on a chart showing the results of a survey by DI personnel on the Discovery II in 1935.

Spits of Antarctica
Landforms of the South Shetland Islands
Landforms of King George Island (South Shetland Islands)